Anthony Martin (born 4 December 1975), better known as Lutan Fyah, is a Jamaican musician, singer, and member of the Rastafari movement Bobo Shanti.

Background
Born in Spanish Town, Saint Catherine Parish, Jamaica, Martin studied Architecture at the University of Technology and played professional football for Constant Spring F.C. before focusing on music.

Using the stage name Lutan Fyah, sometimes credited as Lute and Fyah, he started his musical career in 1999. He recorded his first songs for Buju Banton's Gargamel Records. His first two albums were released by Lustre Kings and Minor 7 Flat 5, the latter of which included Fyah as guest artist on albums by Turbulence and Luciano.

Fyah also released several singles on various label from Jamaica, United States and the UK, and has also covered Dr. Dre songs and The Fugees. He has appeared on many compilation albums and featured in many other artists song releases. In 2009 Dubstep artist Rusko released Babylon Volume 2 including the track "Sound Guy Is My Target" featuring Fyah.

Fyah has voiced a number of singles for Jah Warrior including Never Surrender My Faith, Let Righteousness Be Your Guide, Jah is living featuring Khalilah Rose and Crab Inna Barrel. Fyah has performed several times at the Uppsala Reggae Festival.

His tenth studio album, Life of a King, was released in September 2013, and was followed by European and African tours. A concert from December 2013 to celebrate his birthday, featuring guests including Chezidek, Jah Mason, Fantan Mojah, Jah Cure, Gyptian, Sizzla, Ninjaman, and Popcaan, was recorded for DVD release.

In September 2019, his fifteenth studio album, Longest Liva, was released, featuring collaborations with Johnny Live and Beenie Man.

Discography
 Dem No Know Demself (2004), Minor 7 Flat 5
 Time & Place (2005), Lustre Kings
 Phantom War (2006), Greensleeves
 Healthy Lifestyle (2006), VP
 You Bring Blessings, (2007), Cousins
 African Be Proud (2009), Rastar
 Africa (2009), Continental Record Services
 Justice (2009), Philadub
 The King's Son (2009), In the Streetz Music
 A New Day (2011), Starplayer
 Truly (2012), One Drop
 Nuh Fear (2012), (featured with Gisto), Historical
 Life of a King (2013), Grillaras
 Get Rid A Di Wicked (2014), Bread Back
 Dash Ah Fire (2017), Robert E Productions 
 Music Never Dies (2017), Grade Records
 Sell Out (2018), Studio Vibes Entertainment
 Longest Liva (2019), Lock City Music Group

Live albums
Live in San Francisco (2009), 2B1

References

1975 births
Living people
Jamaican reggae singers
Jamaican male singers
People from Spanish Town
Performers of Rastafarian music
Jamaican Rastafarians
Easy Star Records artists